Breach of trust is a type of civil wrong in English trust law.

Breach of trust or Breach of Trust may also refer to:

Films
 Breach of Trust (2017 film), a Cameroonian drama
 A Secret Life (film), a 1999 American made-for-TV film released in Britain as Breach of Trust
 Abuso de confianza (English title: Breach of Trust), a 1950 Argentine film

Literature
 Breach of Trust: How Americans Failed Their Soldiers and Their Country, a book by Andrew Bacevich
 Breach of Trust: How Washington Turns Outsiders Into Insiders, a book by U.S. Senator Tom Coburn
 Breach of Trust, a storyline in the comic book Stormwatch: Post Human Division

Other uses
 Criminal offences relating to breach of trust by a public official (s. 122) or a trustee (s. 336) under the Criminal Code (Canada)
 Penal Code (Singapore)#Criminal breach of trust
 Breach of fiduciary responsibility
 Breach of Trust (band), a Canadian rock band

See also
Breach of promise
Breach of confidence
Breach of contract